Yadkin Township is one of nine townships in Stokes County, North Carolina, United States. The township had a population of 19,592 according to the 2000 census and is by the far the largest township by population in Stokes County.

Geographically, Yadkin Township occupies  in southwestern Stokes County and is also the largest township by land area in Stokes County.  The township's western border is with Surry County and the southern border is with Forsyth County. The incorporated municipality of King is located here as well as parts of the Forsyth County town of Tobaccoville.  Additionally, Yadkin Township has many unincorporated communities, including, Chestnut Grove, Dalton, Mountain View, Mount Olive, Pinnacle, Poplar Springs and Volunteer.

Townships in Stokes County, North Carolina
Townships in North Carolina